Helen A. Neville is a professor of educational psychology and African-American studies at the University of Illinois at Urbana–Champaign, where she has taught since 2001. She previously served on the faculty of the University of Missouri, where she was the co-founder and co-director of the Center for Multicultural Research, Training, and Consultation. She received the Association of Black Psychologists' Distinguished Psychologist of the Year Award in 2011 and was a Fulbright Scholar in Tanzania in 2015–2016. She served as president of Division 45 of the American Psychological Association, the Society for the Psychological Study of Culture, Ethnicity, and Race, in 2018.

References

External links
Faculty page

Living people
21st-century American psychologists
University of Missouri faculty
University of Illinois Urbana-Champaign faculty
California State University, Northridge alumni
University of California, Santa Barbara alumni
American women psychologists
Educational psychologists
Black studies scholars
Year of birth missing (living people)
American women academics
21st-century American women